Galloway or Gallaway is a rural unincorporated community in south east Panola County, Texas, United States, on Farm Road 31,  southeast of Carthage and  from the Louisiana state line and De Soto Parish.

The town was founded shortly after the Civil War. A school was opened in the early 1880s and by 1897 had an enrollment of 30 students. By the mid-1930s and the Great Depression, the town also had a church, general store, and a number of houses.

After World War II, the Galloway's school district was merged with that of Carthage, but in the 1960s the town had retained enough population to support the church, a community center, and several small businesses. The town is now fairly dispersed with an estimated population of 71 at both the 1990 and 2000 censuses.

Notable people
Galloway is the birthplace of country music singer Jim Reeves.

References

Unincorporated communities in Panola County, Texas
Unincorporated communities in Texas